Dolph Ziggler and Robert Roode, sometimes referred to as The Dirty Dawgs, were a professional wrestling tag team performed in WWE, where they are former one-time WWE Raw Tag Team Champions and one-time WWE SmackDown Tag Team Champions.

History 
After being randomly paired together on the August 26 episode of Raw, Dolph Ziggler teamed with Robert Roode to win a tag-team turmoil match to earn a Raw Tag Team Championship match at Clash of Champions. At the event, Ziggler and Roode won the titles from Seth Rollins and Braun Strowman. On the October 14 episode of Raw, Ziggler and Roode lost the titles to The Viking Raiders (Erik and Ivar), ending their reign at 29 days, and they were drafted to the SmackDown brand as part of the 2019 WWE Draft. 

At Survivor Series, Ziggler and Roode won a 10-team Interbrand Tag Team Battle Royal. In the following weeks, they aligned themselves with King Corbin during his feud against Roman Reigns. On January 26, 2020, at the Royal Rumble, Roode entered the Royal Rumble match at number 4, but was eliminated by Brock Lesnar. Ziggler also entered at number 19, but was eliminated by Roman Reigns. At Super ShowDown, Ziggler suffered a loss to Mansoor. A week later at Elimination Chamber, Ziggler and Roode competed in the namesake match for the SmackDown Tag Team Championship, where the champions John Morrison and the Miz retained. On the June 22 episode of Raw,  it was announced that Ziggler and Roode were traded to the Raw brand for AJ Styles. On that night, Ziggler issued a challenge to WWE Champion Drew McIntyre, which McIntyre accepted for The Horror Show at Extreme Rules. At the event on July 19, Ziggler failed to win the title.

As part of the 2020 Draft in October, both Ziggler and Roode were drafted back to the SmackDown brand. On the January 8, 2021 episode of SmackDown, Ziggler and Roode defeated The Street Profits (Angelo Dawkins and Montez Ford) to win the SmackDown Tag Team Championship. On April 9, 2021, at WrestleMania SmackDown, Roode and Ziggler defeated Alpha Academy (Chad Gable & Otis), the team of Rey & Dominik Mysterio and The Street Profits in a Fatal 4-Way match to retain the titles. On the April 16 episode of Smackdown, Ziggler and Roode would have another successful title defense as they defeated The Street Profits. They lost the titles to Rey & Dominik Mysterio at WrestleMania Backlash, ending their reign at 128 days. As part of the 2021 Draft, The Dirty Dawgs were drafted to the Raw brand.

On the February 22, 2022 episode of NXT 2.0, during a match between Dolph Ziggler and Tommaso Ciampa, Roode interfered in the match disguised as a cameraman to help Ziggler get the win. On the March 1, episode of NXT 2.0, The Dirty Dawgs were defeated by NXT Champion Bron Breakker and Tommaso Ciampa. The following week, at NXT Roadblock, Ziggler, with the help of Roode, defeated Ciampa and Breakker to win his first NXT Championship. After a lengthy absence since Ziggler lost the NXT Championship, Ziggler and Roode returned on the June 6 episode of Raw in an on-stage interview segment. However, MVP and Omos would interrupt both Ziggler and Roode and insult them, to which Ziggler retaliated by delivering a superkick to MVP, which led to Omos chasing both Ziggler and Roode out of the arena, therefore turning both men face in the process. 

On the July 11 episode of Raw, Ziggler returned minus Roode, starting his singles competition. In September, it was reported that Roode underwent a procedure and would be out of action, thus ending the team.

Championships and accomplishments 
 Pro Wrestling Illustrated
 Ranked Dolph Ziggler No. 46 of the top 500 singles wrestlers in the PWI 500 in 2019
 Ranked Robert Roode No. 51 of the top 500 singles wrestlers in the PWI 500 in 2019
 WWE
 WWE Raw Tag Team Championship (1 time)
 WWE SmackDown Tag Team Championship (1 time)
 NXT Championship (1 time) – Ziggler

References

External links
Dolph Ziggler – WWE profile
Robert Roode – WWE profile
The Dirty Dawgs – Cagematch profile

WWE NXT teams and stables
WWE teams and stables